Jorge Alberto Enríquez (born 16 April 1972) is an Argentine rower. He competed in the men's lightweight coxless four event at the 1996 Summer Olympics.

References

External links
 
 

1972 births
Living people
Argentine male rowers
Olympic rowers of Argentina
Rowers at the 1996 Summer Olympics
Place of birth missing (living people)